Ditomus is a genus of beetles in the family Carabidae, containing the following species:

 Ditomus calydonius P. Rossi, 1790
 Ditomus tricuspidatus Fabricius, 1792

References

Harpalinae